West Monroe is a city in Ouachita Parish, Louisiana, United States. It is situated on the Ouachita River, across from the neighboring city of Monroe. The two cities are often referred to as the Twin Cities of northeast Louisiana.  Its population was 13,065 at the 2010 census and it is part of the Monroe Metropolitan Statistical Area. The mayor is Staci Albritton Mitchell.

History
Originally laid out in 1837 as Byron by John Campbell at the foot of the ferry landing to Monroe, the town floundered and Campbell went bankrupt. The area was bought by Christopher Dabbs, a doctor from Virginia who submitted the plans for Cotton Port in 1854; it was officially recognized in 1859. It too languished until the arrival of the Vicksburg, Shreveport and Pacific Railway and the construction of the bridge over the Ouachita River. Cotton Port boomed as a river port and rail depot.

Geography
According to the United States Census Bureau, the city has a total area of 8.0 square miles (20.6 km), of which 7.7 square miles (20.0 km) is land and 0.2 square mile (0.6 km) (3.14%) is water.

West Monroe is a separate municipality from Monroe.

Demographics

2020 census

As of the 2020 United States census, there were 13,103 people, 5,616 households, and 2,636 families residing in the city.

2000 census
As of the census of 2000, there were 13,250 people, 5,734 households, and 3,457 families residing in the city. The racial makeup of the city was 61.9% White, 33.6% African American, 0.4% Native American, 0.8% Asian, 0.05% Pacific Islander, 0.48% from other races, and 1.00% from two or more races. Hispanic or Latino of any race were 3.5% of the population.

There were 5,734 households, out of which 26.7% had children under the age of 18 living with them, 38.5% were married couples living together, 17.8% had a female householder with no husband present, and 39.7% were non-families. 34.5% of all households were made up of individuals, and 14.0% had someone living alone who was 65 years of age or older. The average household size was 2.25 and the average family size was 2.90.

In the city, the population was spread out, with 23.8% under the age of 18, 10.9% from 18 to 24, 26.9% from 25 to 44, 20.2% from 45 to 64, and 18.3% who were 65 years of age or older. The median age was 36 years. For every 100 females, there were 83.5 males. For every 100 females age 18 and over, there were 79.6 males.

The median income for a household in the city was $27,522, and the median income for a family was $35,348. Males had a median income of $28,231 versus $22,533 for females. The per capita income for the city was $16,803. About 15.6% of families and 21.6% of the population were below the poverty line, including 36.1% of those under age 18 and 13.1% of those age 65 or over.

Government
The current mayor is Staci Albritton Mitchell, who has served since 2018.

A 2013 "Community Impressions" report complimented the green spaces, including the Kiroli and Restoration parks, and Antique Alley as important assets to the West Monroe community.
According to long-term Mayor Dave Norris, the study confirms "the value of many of the projects we've focused on to enhance quality of life." The report identifies situations in need of improvement, many of which have already been addressed, including insufficient or inaccurate signage to area attractions, brown water and the need to renovate certain wells, limited shopping opportunities for clothing, traffic problems on Thomas Road, and the failure to promote the popular phenomenon created from the West Monroe-based A&E reality television series, Duck Dynasty. The consultants declared West Monroe and the general area west of the Ouachita River overall as "a clean, vibrant, growing friendly area ... [with] a small town atmosphere and yet ... many of the amenities and features of a [larger] city."

National Guard
1022nd Engineer Company (Vertical) of the 527th Engineer Battalion of the 225th Engineer Brigade is located in West Monroe.

Notable people
Evelyn Blackmon, Realtor and member of the Louisiana House of Representatives from District 15 from 1984 to 1988

Donnie Copeland, former West Monroe Pentecostal assistant pastor and Republican member of the Arkansas House of Representatives, 2015 to 2017
Clarence Faulk, publisher, broadcaster, businessman in Ruston, born in West Monroe in 1909
William C. Feazel, oilman, interim U.S. Senator in 1948, and member of the Louisiana House of Representatives from 1932 to 1936
Bruce Fowler, opera singer
Andy Griggs, country singer
Kevin Gordon, Americana singer/songwriter
James D. Halsell, astronaut; space shuttle pilot
Dixon Hearne, author
Alton Hardy Howard, co-founder of Howard Brothers Discount Stores; gospel songwriter and author
Bradie James, NFL linebacker for the Dallas Cowboys who played football at Louisiana State University, Wossman High School, before transferring to West Monroe High School
Rickey Minor, music director, composer and music producer. Born in Monroe.
William Wiley Norris, III (1936-2016), city, district, and circuit court judge
Webb Pierce, Country Music Hall of Fame member
Cassidy Riley, professional wrestler for WWE and TNA
Phil Robertson, Duck Dynasty star and founder of Duck Commander
Kay Robertson, Duck Dynasty star
Sadie Robertson, Duck Dynasty star
Si Robertson, Duck Dynasty star
Willie Robertson, Duck Dynasty star
Jase Robertson, Duck Dynasty star
Korie Robertson, Duck Dynasty star
Bill Russell, professional basketball player, center for Boston Celtics, five-time NBA Most Valuable Player and twelve-time All-Star
Mike Walsworth, 1st State Senator from West Monroe
Andrew Whitworth, NFL offensive tackle for the Los Angeles Rams who played football at Louisiana State University and West Monroe High School

References

External links

 City of West Monroe
 Monroe-West Monroe Convention & Visitors Bureau
 West Monroe history

Cities in Louisiana
Cities in Ouachita Parish, Louisiana
Cities in North Louisiana
Louisiana populated places on the Ouachita River